The shaded-pole motor is the original type of AC  single-phase induction motor, dating back to at least as early as 1890. A shaded-pole motor is a small squirrel-cage motor in which the auxiliary winding is composed of a copper ring or bar surrounding a portion of each pole. When single phase AC supply is applied to the stator winding, due to shading provided to the poles, a rotating magnetic field is generated. This auxiliary single-turn winding is called a shading coil. Currents induced in this coil by the magnetic field create a second electrical phase by delaying the phase of  magnetic flux change for that pole (a shaded pole) enough to provide a 2-phase rotating magnetic field. The direction of rotation is from the unshaded side to the shaded (ring) side of the pole.  Since the phase angle between the shaded and unshaded sections is small, shaded-pole motors produce only a small starting torque relative to torque at full speed.  Shaded-pole motors of the asymmetrical type shown are only reversible by disassembly and flipping over the stator, though some similar looking motors have small, switch-shortable auxiliary windings of thin wire instead of thick copper bars and can reverse electrically.  Another method of  electrical reversing involves four coils (two pairs of identical coils).

The common, asymmetrical form of these motors (pictured) has only one winding, with no capacitor or starting windings/starting switch, making them economical and reliable.  Larger and more modern types may have multiple physical windings, though electrically only one, and a capacitor may be used.  Because their starting torque is low, they are best suited to driving fans or other loads that are easily started.  They may have multiple taps near one electrical end of the winding, which provides variable speed and power by selection of one tap at a time, as in ceiling fans.  Moreover, they are compatible with TRIAC-based variable-speed controls, which often are used with fans.  They are built in power sizes up to about  output. Above , they are not common, and for larger motors, other designs offer better characteristics. A main disadvantage is their low efficiency of around 26%. A major advantage is that the motor's stall current is only slightly higher than the running current, so there is low risk of severe over-heating or tripping the circuit protection if the motor is stalled for some reason.

Types
Squirrel-cage induction motor:  The most common type of shaded-pole motor in fractional horsepower use is the squirrel-cage induction motor.  This has a rotor that consists of a laminated steel cylinder with conductive copper or aluminum bars embedded lengthwise in its surface, connected at the ends.

See also 
 Shaded-pole synchronous motor

References 

Induction motors